Colored Episcopal Mission is an obsolete Anglican term used by the Episcopal Church in the United States of America.The term was coined in the 19th century.

The Episcopal Church supported a separate African-American religious life during the 19th century and early 20th century. Parishes established by African-American communicants during this period of time were chartered as Colored Episcopal Missions.The duality of the Church encouraged a separate cultivation of Black religious life through the nineteenth and twentieth centuries. It encouraged the separate parishes while depriving African Americans a voice or representation in church governance.  Parish status was awarded when the mission became financially independent from the diocese. It was common for these missions to have a long duration as a mission before reaching parish status.

The first established Colored Episcopal Mission is St. Thomas Episcopal in Philadelphia, Pennsylvania. It was established in 1794.

Archives
Established in 2003, the Virginia Theological Seminary Archives and the Historical Society of the Episcopal Church jointly manage the African American Episcopal Historical Collection. The collection contains the personal papers, institutional records, oral histories and photographs of many historically black missions.

References
The Church Awakens: African Americans and the Search for Justice. (n.d.). Retrieved March 17, 2015, from http://www.episcopalarchives.org/Afro-Anglican_history/exhibit/legacy/black_parishes.php

Further reading
Episcopalians and Race: Civil War to Civil Rights. Gardiner H. Shattuck (2003)

Episcopal Church (United States)
Anglicanism
Christian terminology
Christian culture
Christianity and race
History of racial segregation in the United States
African-American segregation in the United States
Racial segregation
History of religion in the United States